Roy V. Aragon also known as Roy Vadil Aragon is a Filipino writer writing in the Ilokano and Filipino languages. He is a fictionist and poet, and also works as a translator, an editor, a book designer. Among his awards and prizes are three third-place prizes and one second-place prize in the Don Carlos Palanca Memorial Awards for Literature's short story contest in the Ilokano and Filipino divisions, received in 1999, 2001, 2014, and 2016, respectively. He has also won numerous prizes in Ilokano literary contests, such as the Gov. Roque Ablan Awards for Iloko Literature (GRAAFIL). He has published most of his short stories, poems, and feature articles in Bannawag, the leading Ilokano magazine in the Philippines.

He is a member of GUMIL Filipinas, the leading association of Ilokano writers which is considered the most active regional writer's group in the Philippines.

He is a native of Mabasa, Dupax del Norte, Nueva Vizcaya.

Works

 Short Stories: "Balang," "Babe," "Siak ni Kafka, Pusa," "Kanibusanan," "Bannuar," "Garami, Bislak, Bamban ken Padeppa," "Sirikit," "Maysa a Malem iti Paraiso," "Panungpalan," "Mijar Vadil, Mannurat: Taga-Dupax" "Ang Baliw ng Bayan ng Sili," "Penelope," "Dapo," "Tokhang (Ladawan)"
 Books: Napili ken Saan a Napili a DANDANIW ken Dadduma Pay a Riknakem BAGI: dandaniw (Ilokano poetry), Bannuar ken Dadduma Pay a Fiksion (Ilokano fiction), paksuy: dandaniw & poems (Ilokano and English poetry), Baribari (Ilokano poetry), Rabii: 100 a #tweetniw (Ilokano poetry), Atap: Baro ken Napabaro a Dandaniw (Ilokano poetry)

Awards

 Palanca Awards
 Talaang Ginto-Gantimpalang Collantes, Komisyon sa Wikang Filipino
 Gov. Roque Ablan Awards for Iloko Literature (GRAAFIL)

Sources 
 Facebook profile of Roy V. Aragon
 Roy V. Aragon's author's bionote on Imnas & Iway Publication website

References

Ilocano-language writers
Tagalog-language writers
Filipino male short story writers
Filipino short story writers
Palanca Award recipients
Living people
Ilocano people
People from Nueva Vizcaya
Year of birth missing (living people)